St. Anne Convent, located in Melbourne, Kentucky, is the home of the American Province of the Congregation of Divine Providence, a community of Roman Catholic Sisters. The convent houses the provincial offices of the congregation, the residences of two local communities, as well as Moye Spiritual Life Center. There are 140 members of the American Province of Sisters of Divine Providence, but the congregation also has provinces in France and Madagascar.

History
The convent was constructed in 1919 to replace the former Provincial House at Our Lady of Providence Academy in Newport and Mt. St. Martin's also in Newport.

In the 1988 movie Rain Man, St. Anne Convent served as the backdrop of the fictitious Wallbrook mental institution.  Actors Tom Cruise and Dustin Hoffman appear in several scenes in front of the convent and traveling down its long oak-lined entrance.

On December 1, 2007, the convent announced that some of the trees would be cut down due to poor health, falling limbs, and the convent's inability to afford the annual maintenance.  It was rumored that a private donor from Ft. Thomas, Kentucky, offered to pay the annual cost and prevent the trees from being cut down.  Nevertheless, all of the trees were cut down. However, new trees were planted beside the old ones in 2008 and the hope is that one day they stand as tall as the old trees.

On August 23, 2012, it was announced that the convent, attached retreat center, and grounds would be purchased from the Sisters of Divine Providence in early 2013 by the Diocese of Covington. Bishop Roger Foys included in the announcement that the move would "enable the diocese to upgrade and expand our retreat programs." The Sisters however will continue to own the Holy Family Infirmary, cemetery, and some other surrounding grounds and structures.

The convent is the former owner of the St. Anne Wetlands, a seasonal wetland conservation area also located in Melbourne.  In September 2013, the land was purchased by the Campbell County Conservation District through funds from the Kentucky Heritage Land Conservation Fund.

Roman Catholic bishop Ferdinand Brossart, of the Diocese of Covington, Kentucky, rests in the convent's cemetery.

St. Anne Retreat Center today is often used as a place for the high school and college students of Ohio, Kentucky, and the surrounding areas to hold Emmaus, Kairos, and other Christian retreats. St. Anne Convent is known as a place of prayer, peace, and hospitality.

References

External links
St. Anne Convent, Congregation of Divine Providence
A brief history of St. Anne Convent's founders
Photos of St. Anne Convent

Roman Catholic Diocese of Covington
Buildings and structures in Campbell County, Kentucky
Catholic Church in Kentucky
Christian organizations established in 1909
Roman Catholic monasteries in the United States
Congregation of Divine Providence